Lee Langeveldt (born 10 November 1986) is a South African association footballer who plays for National First Division club Stellenbosch.

Career
Langeveldt is a goalkeeper and began his career at South African club Idas Valley. He was a product of the former football school in South Africa, UPE-FCK at University of Port Elizabeth. He left the football school heading to FC Fortune, which in turn sent him to the Danish club F.C. Copenhagen's second team Kjøbenhavns Boldklub. In August 2007 he signed for South African football club Santos.

International 
He was selected for the South African squad at the 2005 CONCACAF Gold Cup.

External links

1985 births
Living people
People from Stellenbosch
Cape Coloureds
South African soccer players
Association football goalkeepers
Santos F.C. (South Africa) players
Kjøbenhavns Boldklub players
Milano United F.C. players
Lamontville Golden Arrows F.C. players
Stellenbosch F.C. players
2005 CONCACAF Gold Cup players
Soccer players from the Western Cape